Carl Granderson (born December 18, 1996) is an American football defensive end for the New Orleans Saints of the National Football League (NFL). After playing college football at Wyoming, he was signed by the Saints as an undrafted free agent in 2019.

Professional career

Granderson signed with the New Orleans Saints as an undrafted free agent following the 2019 NFL Draft on May 10, 2019. He received a $15,000 signing bonus and a base salary guarantee of $70,000. He was placed on the reserve/did not report list on July 18, 2019, while serving his prison sentence. He was reinstated from the "did not report" list and given a roster exemption on August 31, 2019, after his release from jail. He was placed on the active roster on September 16, 2019.

On March 10, 2022, Granderson signed a two-year contract extension with the Saints.

Personal
Granderson was sentenced to six months in prison on July 11, 2019, after pleading no contest to sexual battery and unlawful contact from an incident in 2018 involving two women. After 43 days in jail, on August 26, a judge suspended his jail sentence and sentenced him to one year of supervised probation instead.

References

External links
New Orleans Saints bio
Wyoming Cowboys football bio

1996 births
Living people
Players of American football from Sacramento, California
American football defensive ends
Wyoming Cowboys football players
New Orleans Saints players